Paul Daniels (born June 4, 1981 in Burlington, Wisconsin) is an American rower.
He studied at the University of Wisconsin and then in 2005 come to the UK to study an MSc Nature, Society & Env. Policy at St Anne's College in the University of Oxford. He is a former member of Oxford University Boat Club (rowing in the 2005 boat race) and St Anne's Boat Club.

Daniels is an actuary working for Blenheim Capital Management. He has worked at Blenheim for some time and was previously an analyst at Blenheim.

References

External links
 Picture of 2005 team

1981 births
Living people
American male rowers
Pan American Games medalists in rowing
Pan American Games gold medalists for the United States
Pan American Games silver medalists for the United States
Rowers at the 2003 Pan American Games
World Rowing Championships medalists for the United States